Essi Moh is a singer, actor songwriter and guitar player.

Moh's name refers to the Algerian saying "Dar Essi moh, edkhoul ou rouh", which means : "Essi Moh’s place, you can enter it and leave it whenever you want!".

Moh started his career as a guitarist playing reggae, soul music, chanson française, blues, and gnawi. He performed in different venues, including the New Morning, Casino de Paris, and Cabaret Sauvage.

In 2010,  Moh and song writer Karim Kiared recorded EP Zenjabil. Its success encoraged Moh to produce his first full album. Zenjabil v2.0 in 2011.

Moh formed his band with Jean-Michel Franciette on drums, Salah Boutamine on bass, Vincent Raymond on trumpet, Krimo Yahioune on guitar, Amine Acyl and Valery Pellegrini on percussion, arrangements and sound engineering.

In June 2013, Moh wrote and recorded music for the play Classic Coiffure at the Auguste Théâtre in Paris.

Moh acted in the movie  by Lazh Lo and also wrote and produced the music.

Discography 

2010: Khatini
2011: Zenjabile v2.0

References

External links 
 Essi Moh's Official Website
 Essi Moh Radio Hchicha

Year of birth missing (living people)
Living people
Algerian songwriters
21st-century Algerian male singers